Locust Creek is a tributary of Shamokin Creek in Northumberland County, Pennsylvania, in the United States. The stream is designated as impaired due to metals from abandoned mine drainage. It also experiences a low pH. The creek flows through a water gap in Locust Mountain. Prominent land uses in its watershed include refuse areas and forested land. The creek's watershed is designated as a Coldwater Fishery and a Migratory Fishery.

Course

Locust Creek begins in a pond in East Cameron Township. It flows east-northeast through a deep, broad valley for several tenths of a mile before entering Mount Carmel Township. The creek flows east-northeast for more than a mile before receiving an unnamed tributary from the right and abruptly turning north-northwest. For the next several tenths of a mile, it flows alongside Pennsylvania Route 54 through a water gap. The stream then leaves the water gap, crosses Pennsylvania Route 901, and turns west. A few tenths of a mile further downstream, it reaches its confluence with Shamokin Creek.

Tributaries
Locust Creek has no named tributaries, but it has one unnamed tributary. This tributary is known as UNT

Hydrology
Locust Creek has poor water quality. The entire length of Locust Creek is designated as an impaired waterbody. The cause of the impairment is metals and the source is abandoned mine drainage. The acid mine drainage impacts to the creek are severe.

Locust Creek is an intermittent stream, with some ephemeral reaches. It is fed by several mine discharges known collectively as the Locust Gap Mine discharges. The creek also leaks water into underground mines.

As of 1972, the pH of Locust Creek averages 3.6, but can be as low as 3.2. The concentration of dissolved solids was high enough to cause sanitation problems. The turbidity of the stream was 1.0 Nephelometric Turbidity Units.

Geography, geology, and watershed

There is a thick coating of iron precipitate on Locust Creek. Locust Gap is in the vicinity of the creek. The watershed is fairly flat, with many slopes being 25 percent or less. The creek cuts a water gap through Locust Mountain, revealing an anticlinal.

The stream is entirely within the United States Geological Survey quadrangle of Mount Carmel.

Much of the watershed of Locust Creek is occupied by refuse areas. However, the creek's watershed is mostly on forested land.

Explo-Tech Inc. has a permit to discharge some form of waste into Locust Creek.

History and recreation
Locust Creek was entered into the Geographic Names Information System on August 2, 1979. Its identifier in the Geographic Names Information System is 1179768.

A bridge carrying Pennsylvania Route 901 crosses Locust Creek. This bridge has been slated for preservation as part of the state of Pennsylvania's "Decade of Investment". There are some trails in the vicinity of the creek's headwaters.

Biology
The drainage basin of Locust Creek is designated as a Coldwater Fishery and a Migratory Fishery. 

Species such as Juncus biflorus and Platanthera ciliaris could potentially inhabit the area near the headwaters of Locust Creek.

See also
Quaker Run, next tributary of Shamokin Creek going downstream
North Branch Shamokin Creek, next tributary of Shamokin Creek going upstream
List of rivers of Pennsylvania
List of tributaries of Shamokin Creek

References

Rivers of Northumberland County, Pennsylvania
Tributaries of Shamokin Creek
Rivers of Pennsylvania